Lateran and Laterano are the shared names of several buildings in Rome. The properties were once owned by the Lateranus family of the Roman Empire. The Laterani lost their properties to Emperor Constantine who gave them to the Catholic Church in 311.

The most famous Lateran buildings are the Lateran Palace, once called the Palace of the Popes, and the Archbasilica of Saint John Lateran, the cathedral of Rome, which although part of Italy is a property of the Holy See, which has extraterritorial privileges as a result of the 1929 Lateran Treaty. As the official ecclesiastical seat of the pope, Saint John Lateran is the papal cathedra. The Lateran is Christendom's earliest basilica.

Attached to the basilica is the Lateran Baptistery, one of the oldest in Christendom. Other constituent parts of the Lateran complex are the building of the Scala Sancta with the Sancta Sanctorum and the Triclinium of Pope Leo III.

The Pontifical Lateran University, or simply Lateranum, is one of the pontifical universities of Rome. An ecclesiastical college in the Philippines was named after the Archbasilica of Saint John Lateran, the Colegio de San Juan de Letran, founded in 1620.

References

External links

Scala Sancta (Holy Stairs) - Article from the Catholic Encyclopedia
Christian Museum of Lateran - Article from the Catholic Encyclopedia
Colegio de San Juan de Letran#History

Buildings and structures in Rome
Holy See